Bootzin is a surname. It may refer to:

Richard Bootzin (1940–2014), American clinical and research psychologist
Robert Bootzin known as Gypsy Boots and Boots Bootzin (1914–2004), American fitness pioneer, actor and writer
Joel Bootzin is a patent attorney
Michael Bootzin is a musician, teacher, and activist